The 23 centimeter, 1200 MHz or 1.2 GHz band is a portion of the UHF (microwave) radio spectrum internationally allocated to amateur radio and amateur satellite use on a secondary basis.  The amateur radio band is between 1240 MHz and 1300 MHz.  The amateur satellite band is between 1260 MHz and 1270 MHz, and its use by satellite operations is only for up-links on a non-interference basis to other radio users (ITU footnote 5.282).  The allocations are the same in all three ITU regions.

In the United Kingdom the band is between 1240 MHz and 1325 MHz.

Most modes of communication used in amateur radio can be found in the 23 cm band.  Some of the more common modes include voice, data, EME (moonbounce), as well as ATV.

History

List of notable frequencies 

Frequencies in the 23 cm band are harmonized by International Telecommunication Union region.

Region 1 
CW and SSB calling frequency is 1296.2 MHz.
FM simplex calling frequency is 1297.5 MHz.

Region 2 
CW and SSB calling frequency is 1296.1 MHz.
FM simplex calling frequency is 1294.5 MHz.

Region 3 
FM Simplex Calling Frequency is 1294.0 MHz (VK Australian band-plan 2007)

In 2008 the IARU Region-1 Cavtat Conference designated 1240.000-1240.750 MHz as an alternative centre for narrowband activity and beacons. This is a mitigation for sharing with existing aviation radars and Primary users, or for potential
issues with the European Galileo system.

See also 
Amateur radio frequency allocations

References 

Amateur radio bands
Centimetric bands